The 2011 Ebonyi State House of Assembly election was held on April 26, 2011, to elect members of the Ebonyi State House of Assembly in Nigeria. All the 24 seats were up for election in the Ebonyi State House of Assembly.

Results

Izzi West 
PDP candidate Nwifuru Francis Ogbonna won the election.

Onicha East 
PDP candidate Odefa Obasi Odefa won the election.

Ezza North West 
ANPP candidate Enyi O. Chukwuma won the election.

Afikpo North West 
PDP candidate Ikoro Ogbonna Kingsley won the election.

Ebonyi North West 
PDP candidate Ikechukwu Nwankwo won the election.

Ezza South 
PDP candidate Usulor Christian won the election.

Ohaozara West 
PDP candidate Jerry Obasi won the election.

Ezza North East 
ANPP candidate Nwobashi Joseph won the election.

Afikpo South West 
PDP candidate Uduma Chima Eni won the election.

Izzi East 
PDP candidate Nwibo Vincent Mbam won the election.

Abakaliki North 
PDP candidate Nwachukwu Oliver won the election.

Ikwo North 
PDP candidate Nwali Samuel Nwoba won the election.

Ohaukwu South 
PDP candidate Aleke Mabel Ozueaku won the election.

Ebonyi North East 
PDP candidate Nwazunku Chukwuma won the election.

Afikpo South East 
PDP candidate Oji Blaise Eze won the election.

Ikwo South 
PDP candidate Ogiji Imo Chike won the election.

Ishielu South 
PDP candidate Julius Nwokpor won the election.

Ivo 
PDP candidate Lillian Igwe won the election.

Ohaozara East 
PDP candidate Nnenna Nwane won the election.

Ohaukwu North 
PDP candidate Onwe Frank Nwaka won the election.

Onicha West 
PDP candidate Valentine Okike won the election.

Abakaliki South 
PDP candidate Helen Nwobasi won the election.

Ishielu North 
PDP candidate Ogbu Anthony Ikechukwu won the election.

Afikpo North East 
PDP candidate Eloy Ogbonna won the election.

References 

2011 Nigerian House of Assembly elections
Ebonyi State elections